The 2018 CAF Champions League group stage was played from 4 May to 28 August 2018. A total of 16 teams competed in the group stage to decide the eight places in the knockout stage of the 2018 CAF Champions League.

Draw
The draw for the group stage was held on 21 March 2018, 19:00 EET (UTC+2), at the Ritz Carlton in Cairo, Egypt. The 16 teams, all winners of the first round of qualifying, were drawn into four groups of four. The teams were seeded by their performances in the CAF competitions for the previous five seasons (CAF 5-Year Ranking points shown in parentheses). Each group contained one team from each of Pot 1, Pot 2, Pot 3, and Pot 4, and each team was drawn into one of the positions in their group.

Format
In the group stage, each group was played on a home-and-away round-robin basis. The winners and runners-up of each group advanced to the quarter-finals of the knockout stage.

Tiebreakers
The teams were ranked according to points (3 points for a win, 1 point for a draw, 0 points for a loss). If tied on points, tiebreakers were applied in the following order (Regulations III. 20 & 21):
Points in head-to-head matches among tied teams;
Goal difference in head-to-head matches among tied teams;
Goals scored in head-to-head matches among tied teams;
Away goals scored in head-to-head matches among tied teams;
If more than two teams are tied, and after applying all head-to-head criteria above, a subset of teams are still tied, all head-to-head criteria above are reapplied exclusively to this subset of teams;
Goal difference in all group matches;
Goals scored in all group matches;
Away goals scored in all group matches;
Drawing of lots.

Schedule
The schedule of each matchday was as follows (matches scheduled in midweek in italics). Effective from the Champions League group stage, weekend matches were played on Fridays and Saturdays while midweek matches were played on Tuesdays, with some exceptions. Kick-off times were also fixed at 13:00 (Saturdays and Tuesdays only), 16:00 and 19:00 GMT.

Groups

Group A

Group B

Group C

Group D

Notes

References

External links
22nd Edition Of Total CAF Champions League, CAFonline.com

2
May 2018 sports events in Africa
July 2018 sports events in Africa
August 2018 sports events in Africa